The 2016 Olympic Wrestling African & Oceania Qualification Tournament was the third regional qualifying tournament for the 2016 Olympics.

The top two wrestlers in each weight class earn a qualification spot for their nation.

Men's freestyle

57 kg
3 April

 Mohamed Maghawri originally finished third, but was later disqualified for doping.

65 kg
3 April

74 kg
3 April

86 kg
3 April

97 kg
3 April

 Aly Hamdy originally qualified for the Olympics, but was later disqualified for doping, giving the spot to Bedopassa Buassat.

125 kg
3 April

Men's Greco-Roman

59 kg
1 April

66 kg
1 April

 Vinod Kumar Dahiya originally qualified for the Olympics, but was later disqualified for doping, giving the spot to Craig Miller.

75 kg
1 April

85 kg
1 April

98 kg
1 April

130 kg
1 April

Women's freestyle

48 kg
2 April

53 kg
2 April

58 kg
2 April

63 kg
2 April

69 kg
2 April

75 kg
2 April

References

External links
United World Wrestling

Qualification Africa
Olympic Q African
W
Wrestling Championships
April 2016 sports events in Africa